Hannes Sigfússon (1922–1997) was an Icelandic poet and writer.

He was an editor of Birtingur, the journal of the Atom Poets. In addition to his poetry, Sigfússon published novels and memoirs and was active as a translator.

Selected works 
Dymbilvaka. 1949
Imbrudagar. 1951
Strandið : skáldsaga. 1955.
Sprek á eldinn. 1961
Kyrjálaheiði. 1995

References

Hannes Sigfússon
Modernist poets
1922 births
1997 deaths
Hannes Sigfússon